Tumor board review is conducted when teams of expert physicians meet to review and discuss complex patients with a diagnosis of cancer. It is a treatment planning approach in which a number of doctors who are experts in different medical specialties review and discuss the medical condition and treatment options of a patient. In cancer treatment, a tumor board review may include that of a medical oncologist (who provides cancer treatment with drugs), a surgical oncologist (who provides cancer treatment with surgery), and a radiation oncologist (who provides cancer treatment with radiation).

External links
 Tumor board review entry in the public domain NCI Dictionary of Cancer Terms

additional references: 1) Cancer.Net ASCO Expert Corner: The Role of a Tumor Board in Cancer Treatment, Anthony F. Provenzano MD

Oncology
Cancer treatments